Gianni Versari (born 7 February 1958) is a Panamanian former swimmer. He competed in two events at the 1976 Summer Olympics.

References

External links
 

1958 births
Living people
Panamanian male swimmers
Olympic swimmers of Panama
Swimmers at the 1976 Summer Olympics
Central American and Caribbean Games bronze medalists for Panama
Central American and Caribbean Games medalists in swimming
Competitors at the 1974 Central American and Caribbean Games
Pan American Games competitors for Panama
Swimmers at the 1975 Pan American Games
Place of birth missing (living people)